Archachatina is a genus of large tropical air-breathing land snails, terrestrial pulmonate gastropod mollusks in the family Achatinidae.

Species 
Species in the genus Archachatina include:

 Archachatina bicarinata (Bruguière, 1789) - São Tomé and Principe
 Archachatina burnupi  (E.A. Smith, 1890)
 Archachatina  buylaerti
 Archachatina camerunensis d'Ailly, 1896
 Archachatina cinnamomea Mellvil & Ponsonby, 1894
 Archachatina cinnamomea  J.C. Melvill & J.H. Ponsonby, 1894
 Archachatina crawfordi Morelet, 1889
 Archachatina degneri Bequaert & Clench, 1936- Ghana
 Archachatina gaboonensis Pilsbry, 1933 - Gabon
 Archachatina insularis  T.E. Crowley & T. Pain, 1961
 Archachatina knorri (Jonas, 1839)
 Archachatina marginata (Swainson, 1821) - giant West African snail, Cameroon through Zaire
 Archachatina m. var. suturalis (Philippi, 1849) - São Tomé and Príncipe
 Archachatina marinae Sirgel- South Africa
 Archachatina papyracea (Pfeiffer, 1845) - Cameroon
 Archachatina p. adelinae Pilsbry, 1905
 Archachatina pentheri  (R. Sturany, 1898)
 Archachatina porphyrostoma  H.A. Pilsbry, 1905
 Archachatina purpurea (Gmelin, 1790) - Ghana
 Archachatina puylaerti  A.R. Mead, 1998
 Archachatina rhodostoma  (R.A. Philippi, 1849)
 Archachatina siderata  (L.A. Reeve, 1849)
 Archachatina subcylindrica  H.B. Preston, 1909
 Archachatina transvaalensis  (E.A. Smith, 1878)
 Archachatina ventricosa Gould, 1850 - Liberia, Sierra Leone, Côte d'Ivoire
 Archachatina v. spectaculum Pilsbry, 1933 - Sierra Leone
 Archachatina viridescens  C.M.F. Ancey

Species brought into synonymy
 Archachatina bequaerti Crowley & Pain, 1961 Malawi: synonym of Bruggenina bequaerti (Crowley & Pain, 1961) (original combination)
 Archachatina churchilliana  (J.C. Melvill & J.H. Ponsonby, 1895): synonym of Cochlitoma churchilliana (Melvill & Ponsonby, 1895) (superseded combination)
 Archachatina dimidiata (E.A. Smith, 1878)- southeastern Africa: synonym of Cochlitoma dimidiata (E. A. Smith, 1878) (superseded combination)
 Archachatina drakensbergensis  (J.C. Melvill & J.H. Ponsonby, 1895): synonym of Cochlitoma drakensbergensis (Melvill & Ponsonby, 1897) (superseded combination)
 Archachatina granulata (Krauss, 1848) - South Africa: synonym of Cochlitoma granulata (F. Krauss, 1848) (superseded combination)
 Archachatina limitanea  A.C. van Bruggen, 1984: synonym of Cochlitoma limitanea (van Bruggen, 1984) (superseded combination)
 Archachatina montistempli van Bruggen, 1965 - South Africa: synonym of Cochlitoma montistempli (van Bruggen, 1965) (superseded combination)
 Archachatina omissa van Bruggen, 1965 - South Africa: synonym of Cochlitoma omissa (van Bruggen, 1965) (superseded combination)
 Archachatina parthenia  (J.C. Melvill & J.H. Ponsonby, 1895): synonym of Cochlitoma parthenia (Melvill & Ponsonby, 1903) (superseded combination)
 Archachatina sanctaeluciae  A.C. van Bruggen, 1989: synonym of Cochlitoma churchilliana (Melvill & Ponsonby, 1895) (junior synonym)
 Archachatina semidecussata (Pfeiffer, 1846): synonym of Cochlitoma semidecussata (L. Pfeiffer, 1846) (superseded combination)
 Archachatina semigranosa  L. Pfeiffer, 1861: synonym of Cochlitoma semigranosa (Pfeiffer, 1861) (superseded combination)
 Archachatina simplex  E.A. Smith, 1878: synonym of Cochlitoma simplex (E. A. Smith, 1878) (superseded combination)
 Archachatina ustulata (Lamarck, 1822) - South Africa: synonym of Cochlitoma ustulata (Lamarck, 1822) (superseded combination)
 Archachatina vestita Pfeiffer, 1855: synonym of Cochlitoma vestita (L. Pfeiffer, 1855) (superseded combination)
 Archachatina zuluensis Connolly - South Africa: synonym of Cochlitoma churchilliana (Melvill & Ponsonby, 1895)

References 

 Bank, R. (2017). Classification of the Recent terrestrial Gastropoda of the World. Last update: July 16, 2017.

External links

 Worldwide Mollusc Species Database: Archachatina

Achatinidae
Taxonomy articles created by Polbot